The Magazzini Contratti is a historic commercial building in Milan, Italy.

History 
Construction works started in 1903. The building was designed by architect Luigi Broggi, who designed several other notable buildings in the area surrounding Piazza Cordusio.

Description 
The building is located in the centre of Milan, and is adjacent to the Palazzo del Credito Italiano. Realized in the new stile moderno or Art Nouveau style, it features a reinforced concrete structure. This technique, highly innovative at the time of construction, allowed for the presence of large windows on the façade interspersed by ornate cast-iron columns.

Gallery

References

External links

Buildings and structures in Milan
Art Nouveau architecture in Milan